Athos Dimoulas (Athens, Greece, 1921–1985) was a Greek poet. He studied civil engineering at the National Technical University of Athens and abroad (in Belgium, England and France), and worked for the Hellenic State Railways from 1944 to 1972. His collection of poems Άλλοτε και αλλού was awarded the State Prize for Poetry in 1967.

Works
Ποιήματα (Poems), 1951
Νέα Ποιήματα (New Poems), 1951
Σονέττα (Sonnets), 1953
Χωρίς τίτλο (Untitled), 1956
Ορφεύς (Orpheus), 1958
Ένδον (Inside), 1960
Αυτή η πραγματικότητα και η άλλη (This Reality and the Other One), 1961
Περί μνήμης (About Poetry), 1964
Άλλοτε και αλλού (Erstwhile and Elsewhere), 1966
Ο αγρός της τύχης (The Field of Luck), 1972
Η μοίρα των πεπρωμένων (The Fate of Destinies), 1979

Notes

External links
A short bio and works (Greek)
Another bio
A poem titled "Theseus" (Greek)

1921 births
1985 deaths
Greek male poets
National Technical University of Athens alumni
Writers from Athens
Greek expatriates in Belgium
Greek expatriates in the United Kingdom
Greek expatriates in France